Lieutenant General Iqroop Singh Ghuman, PVSM, AVSM, ADC is a commissioned officer of the Indian Army. He was the General Officer-Commanding-in-Chief (GOC-in-C), Central Command of the Indian Army. He took office on 2 October when Lt Gen Abhay Krishna retired.

Early life and education 
Ghuman is an alumnus of National Defence Academy, Pune and Indian Military Academy, Dehradun. He has also attended the Junior and Senior Command Course at Army War College, Mhow; Defence Service Staff College course at Defence Services Staff College, Wellington; and National Defence Course Course at National Defence College, Delhi.

Career 
Ghuman was commissioned into Brigade of the Guards in June 1981. He has held various important Command, Staff and Instructor appointments during his career. He has commanded an anti-tank guided missile battalion during Operation Parakram, an infantry brigade and an Infantry Division. He has held various other appointments including an instructor at Army Infantry School, Mhow; Director Perspective Planning in Army Headquarters, Colonel General Staff of Army Training Command; Brigade Major of a mountain brigade; Brigadier General Staff of a Corps in Western India; Major General Operational Logistics at HQ Eastern Command and Chief of Staff of Western Command. He has also served as an observer in the United Nations Mission in Angola. In July 2019, he was appointed to succeed Abhay Krishna as GOC-in-C, Central Command, effective 1 October.

Ghuman served as Deputy Chief of Army Staff (Information Systems & Training) assuming office in 2018.

Prior to Deputy Chief of Army Staff, he was the Commander, XXI Corps of the Indian Army and assumed office, 1 July 2017 onwards. He assumed the post from Lt General Cherish Mathson.

Honours and decorations 
During his career, he has been awarded the Ati Vishisht Seva Medal in 2017 for his service as Chief of Staff of Western Command. and the Param Vishisht Seva Medal in January 2019.

Dates of rank

References 

Living people
Indian generals
National Defence Academy (India) alumni
Recipients of the Ati Vishisht Seva Medal
Year of birth missing (living people)
Recipients of the Param Vishisht Seva Medal
National Defence College, India alumni
Army War College, Mhow alumni
Defence Services Staff College alumni